Ibrahim Ali Kadhum (born 1 July 1950) is an Iraqi former footballer. He competed in the men's tournament at the 1980 Summer Olympics.

Career statistics

International goals
Scores and results list Iraq's goal tally first.

References

External links
 

1950 births
Living people
Iraqi footballers
Iraq international footballers
Olympic footballers of Iraq
1976 AFC Asian Cup players
Footballers at the 1980 Summer Olympics
Place of birth missing (living people)
Association football defenders
Al-Zawraa SC managers
Iraqi football managers
Al-Zawraa SC players